Diving is one of the sports at the quadrennial Commonwealth Games competition. It has been a Commonwealth Games sport since the inaugural edition of the event's precursor, the 1930 British Empire Games. It is an optional sport and may or may not be included in the sporting programme of each edition of the Games.

Editions

All-time medal table
Updated after the 2022 Commonwealth Games

External links
Commonwealth Games sport index

 
Diving
Commonwealth Games